NYN may refer to:

 The IATA code for Nyngan Airport
 The ISO-639 code for the Nkore language
 The train station code for Naini, India
 The geocode for Ningyuan County, Yongzhou Prefecture, Hunan Province, China; see List of administrative divisions of Hunan
 New York Nets ABA/NBA basketball team

See also